Stephen Auer (October 4, 1900 – February 13, 1954) was a Hungarian-born American film producer.

Selected filmography
 The San Antonio Kid (1944)
 Sheriff of Las Vegas (1944)
 Trail of Kit Carson (1945)
 The Madonna's Secret (1946)
 Madonna of the Desert (1948)
 King of the Gamblers (1948)
 Rose of the Yukon (1949)
 Duke of Chicago (1949)
 Trial Without Jury (1950)
 Million Dollar Pursuit (1951)
 Woman in the Dark (1952)

References

Bibliography
  Len D. Martin. The Republic Pictures Checklist: Features, Serials, Cartoons, Short Subjects and Training Films of Republic Pictures Corporation, 1935-1959. McFarland, 1998.

External links

1900 births
1954 deaths
American film producers
Hungarian film producers
Hungarian emigrants to the United States
Film people from Budapest
20th-century American businesspeople